Vishnuvardhan may refer to:

 Vishnuvardhan (actor), Kannada film actor.
 Bharathi Vishnuvardhan, Kannada film actress.
 Vishnuvardhan (director), Tamil film director.
 Vishnu Vardhan (tennis), Indian tennis player.
 Vishnuvardhan (ruler), 6th-century ruler of Malwa, in central India, associated with Yasodharman
 Vishnuvardhana, a 12th-century king of the Hoysala Empire in present-day Indian state of Karna taka